Bellator 289: Stots vs. Sabatello was a mixed martial arts event produced by Bellator MMA that took place on December 9, 2022, at the Mohegan Sun Arena in Uncasville, Connecticut, United States.

Background 
The semi-finals of the $1-million Bellator Bantamweight World Grand Prix took place at this event, with interim champ Raufeon Stots taking on Danny Sabatello, while Patchy Mix took on Magomed Magomedov. Stots defeated Juan Archuleta for the Interim Bellator Bantamweight Championship in their last outing, knocking him out by the way of headkick in the third round. At the same event, Patchy Mix defeated Kyoji Horiguchi by unanimous decision. Sabatello entered the tournament as a wild card, having defeated Jornel Lugo via unanimous decision for a spot in the tournament, while Magomed Magomedov defeated other wild card Enrique Barzola via guillotine choke in the fourth round.

A title bout rematch for the Bellator Women's Flyweight World Championship between champion Liz Carmouche and Juliana Velasquez took place as the co-main event. Carmouche won the title from Velasquez in April; however, the TKO stoppage was considered controversial as many felt that it happened too early. Following the bout, Velasquez's team appealed the result on the grounds of refereeing error made by Mike Beltran, but the appeal was denied by the Hawaii State Boxing Commission.

Results

See also 

 2022 in Bellator MMA
 List of Bellator MMA events
 List of current Bellator fighters
 Bellator MMA Rankings

References 

Bellator MMA events
Events in Uncasville, Connecticut
2022 in mixed martial arts
December 2022 sports events in the United States
2022 in sports in Connecticut
Mixed martial arts in Connecticut
Sports competitions in Connecticut